Mindy White (born June 19, 1989) is an American singer-songwriter and musician from Nashville, Tennessee. She is a former member of Arizona-based indie rock band Lydia and current lead vocalist of indie rock band States. White is also founder and editor of her lifestyle site Hello Real Life.

Early life and career

Mindy was born in Houston, Texas and later moved to Nashville, Tennessee when she was five years old when her parents wanted to pursue music themselves.

In early 2007, she joined Gilbert, Arizona-based indie rock group Lydia, headed by Leighton Antelman, on vocals and keyboard.  Lydia released one studio album with White, titled Illuminate, on March 18, 2008.

In 2009, Mindy left Lydia to start her own musical project, States, with members of Florida-based alternative band Copeland, including Bryan Laurenson (guitar), Jonathan Bucklew (drums), Dean Lorenz (bass), and Stephen Laurenson (guitar). Together, they recorded an EP called Line 'Em Up which came out on October 12, 2010. They then released their full-length studio album, Room to Run, on October 18, 2011, and later re-released it (with the addition of two demos, acoustic versions of two songs from their EP, a remix, and two brand new songs) on June 19, 2012, via Tooth & Nail Records, followed by Paradigm on December 3, 2013, released independently with the help of a successful Kickstarter campaign. Mindy has toured with bands such as Circa Survive, The Starting Line, Set Your Goals, Lights, Copeland, Metro Station, Paramore and others.

Aside from her work with Lydia and States, White has collaborated with Anthony Green of Circa Survive on a holiday cover of the song Baby, It's Cold Outside in 2010 and artist BLACKBEAR on his song "End Up" in 2012.

Mindy is vegan and an avid supporter of animal rights. Mindy supports the ASPCA, WWF, and The Humane Society of the United States. She is married to Forever the Sickest Kids drummer Kyle Burns.

Discography

With Lydia
 Illuminate (March 18, 2008, Low Altitude Records)

With States
 Room to Run (2011, Self-Released, Tooth & Nail)
 Room to Run (Re-Released, June 19, 2012, Tooth & Nail)
 Paradigm (December 3, 2013, self-released)

References

External links
States official website

American rock singers
Living people
1989 births
21st-century American singers